The Betano Power Station (Portuguese Central Eléctrica de Betano) is an oil power station located northeast of Betano, in the Manufahi District of East Timor. It was built to supply the South coast of East Timor with electricity, while the North coast is supplied by the Hera power station.

The power station was inaugurated on August 20, 2013. It has a total output of 136 MW, supplied by eight Wärtsilä 18V46 engine generators. For comparison, the capacity of the Hera power station is slightly lower at 119 MW.

The power station was built by China Nuclear Industry 22nd Construction Company (CNI22). It is owned by Electricidade de Timor-Leste (EDTL), but operated by the Indonesian company Puri Akraya Engineering Ltd. In October 2017, Wartsilä signed a new five-year contract for maintenance of the power station.

As of January 2017, the station runs on light fuel oil, but heavy fuel oil and natural gas can be used as alternatives.

References

Power stations in East Timor
2013 establishments in East Timor
Energy infrastructure completed in 2013
Oil-fired power stations in Asia